"Ooh Poo Pah Doo" is a song written and performed by Jessie Hill. It was arranged and produced by Allen Toussaint. The single reached No. 3 on the Billboard R&B chart and No. 28 on the Hot 100 in 1960.

Ike & Tina Turner versions
Ike & Tina Turner recorded a live version of the song which was released as "Ooh Poop A Doo" by Warner Bros. in 1964. It was included on their 1967 album The Ike & Tina Turner Show – Vol. 2. They recorded a studio version of "Ooh Poo Pah Doo" for their 1970 album Workin' Together. It was released as a single in May 1971 following their hit single "Proud Mary". The single reached No. 31 on the Billboard R&B chart and No. 60 on the Hot 100 chart. It peaked at No. 37 on the Cash Box Top 100 and No. 22 on Cash Box's R&B chart.

Reception 
Billboard (May 8, 1971): "The dynamic duo add a new touch to the old favorite–new lyric and performance, loaded with Hot 100 and soul chart potency. Wild vocal workout."

Cash Box (May 8, 1971): "One of the regulars in LP's by blues and some top forty acts, 'Ooh Poo Pah Doo' is turned into a powerful sales single by the 'Proud Mary' duo. Riding a new peak in their career, Ike & Tina should have no problems seeing this one break R&B and T-40."

Other versions
Ronnie Dio & The Prophets released a version of the song as a single in 1962, but it did not chart.
The Shirelles and King Curtis released a version of the song on their 1962 album Give a Twist Party.  It was also featured on The Shirelles' 1963 album Foolish Little Girl.
Etta James released a version of the song on her 1963 live album Etta James Rocks the House.
Sandy Nelson released a version of the song as the B-side to his 1963 single "Feel So Good".
Rufus Thomas released a version on his 1963 album Walking the Dog
Freddie Fender released a version of the song as a single in 1964, but it did not chart.
The Standells released a version of the song on their 1964 live album In Person at P.J.s.
The Kingsmen released a version of the song on their 1964 album The Kingsmen Volume II and on their 1966 album 15 Great Hits.
The Righteous Brothers on their 1965 album Just Once in My Life
Trini Lopez released a version of the song on his 1965 album The Rhythm & Blues Album.
Mitch Ryder & the Detroit Wheels recorded a version for their 1966 album Break Out.
Steve Alaimo released a version of the song as the B-side to his 1967 single "New Orleans".  It had originally been released on his 1962 album Mashed Potatoes.
The Cake released a version of the song on their 1967 album The Cake.
Wilson Pickett released a version of the song on his 1967 album The Wicked Pickett.
Jimmy Smith released a version of the song on his 1974 album Black Smith.
Dr. Hook released a version of the song on their 1981 live album Live in the U.K.
Paul Revere & the Raiders released a version of the song on their 1990 album The Legend of Paul Revere. They had performed the song on the TV series Hullaballoo in 1965.
Tommy Ridgley released a version of the song on his 1992 album How Long?
Taj Mahal released a version of the song on his 1996 album Phantom Blues.
Steve Miller Band released a version of the song on their 2010 album Bingo!
Scott Walker and The Walker Brothers released a version of the song on their 2016 album Everything Under the Sun - Osaka, Japan 1968.
Australian blues rock band Billy Thorpe and the Aztecs recorded a 15 minute live version of the song at the 1972 Sunbury Pop Festival for their 1972 album Aztecs Live at Sunbury that took up all of side four.

In popular culture
The Shirelles' version was featured in the 1995 film Stonewall.

Chart performance

References

1960 songs
1960 debut singles
1962 singles
1964 singles
1971 singles
Ike & Tina Turner songs
The Shirelles songs
Etta James songs
Sandy Nelson songs
Freddy Fender songs
The Standells songs
Trini Lopez songs
Wilson Pickett songs
Jimmy Smith (musician) songs
Dr. Hook & the Medicine Show songs
Paul Revere & the Raiders songs
Taj Mahal (musician) songs
Steve Miller Band songs
Scott Walker (singer) songs
The Walker Brothers songs
Song recordings produced by Ike Turner
Song recordings produced by Bruce Johnston
Song recordings produced by Andy Johns
Minit Records singles
United Artists Records singles
Atlantic Records singles